The Russian White Dairy or Russian White is a Russian breed of dairy goat. It derives from cross-breeding of the indigenous North Russian with imported Swiss Saanen goats; this began in about 1905. The Gorki derives from it, but is always horned, while the Russian White may be horned or polled. It has become a rare breed, numbering only a few thousand head.

References 

Dairy goat breeds
Goat breeds originating in Russia
Animal breeds originating in the Soviet Union
Goat breeds